Rhododendron williamsianum, the Williams rhododendron, is a species of flowering plant in the heath family Ericaceae.

In cultivation in the UK, Rhododendron williamsianum has gained the Royal Horticultural Society’s Award of Garden Merit. It is hardy down to  but like most rhododendron species requires a sheltered position in dappled shade with acid soil that has been enriched with leaf mould.

References

williamsianum
Flora of China
Plants described in 1913